For the English patristic scholar and Benedictine abbot, see Jacques de Billy (abbot) (1535–1581).

Jacques de Billy (March 18, 1602 – January 14, 1679) was a French Jesuit mathematician.  Born in Compiègne, he subsequently entered the Society of Jesus.  From 1629 to 1630, Billy taught mathematics at the Jesuit College at Pont-à-Mousson. He was still studying theology at this time. From 1631 to 1633, Billy taught mathematics at the Jesuit college at Rheims.  From 1665 to 1668 he was professor of mathematics at the Jesuit college at Dijon.  One of his pupils there was Jacques Ozanam.  Billy also taught in Grenoble.  He also served as rector of a number of Jesuit Colleges in Châlons-en-Champagne, Langres and in Sens.

The mathematician Claude Gaspard Bachet de Méziriac, who had been a pupil of Billy's at Rheims, became a close friend.  Billy maintained a correspondence with the mathematician Pierre de Fermat.

Work and legacy
Billy produced a number of results in number theory which have been named after him.  Bachet introduced Billy to indeterminate analysis.  Billy's mathematical works include Diophantus Redivivus.

In the field of astronomy, he published several astronomical tables.  First published in Dijon by Pierre Palliot in 1656, Billy's tables of eclipses is called Tabulae Lodoicaeae seu universa eclipseon doctrina tabulis, praeceptis ac demonstrationibus explicata. Adiectus est calculus, aliquot eclipseon solis & lunae, quae proxime per totam Europam videbuntur.  The tables were calculated for the years 1656 to 1693.  This work also contains solar and lunar tables based on the Paris meridian.  It also includes a detailed examination of problems involved in astronomical calculations.

Billy was one of the first scientists to reject the role of astrology in science.  He also rejected old notions about the malevolent influence of comets.

He died at Dijon.

The crater Billy on the Moon is named after him.

See also
 List of Jesuit scientists
 List of Roman Catholic scientist-clerics

References
 
 Moon Watch
 Polybiblio

Further reading

1602 births
1679 deaths
17th-century French Jesuits
17th-century French mathematicians
Catholic clergy scientists
Jesuit scientists
Number theorists